Eslamshahr County is in Tehran province, Iran. The capital of the county is the city of Eslamshahr. At the 2006 census, the county's population was 447,192 in 114,009 households. The following census in 2011 counted 485,688 people in 139,408 households. At the 2016 census, the county's population was 548,620 in 168,288 households.

Administrative divisions

The population history and structural changes of Eslamshahr County's administrative divisions over three consecutive censuses are shown in the following table. The latest census shows three districts, six rural districts, and three cities.

Villages
 
 
Ali Abad Qajar
Chichaklu
Gol Dasteh
Hasanabad-e Khaleseh
Hoseynabad
Mafinabad
Shatareh

References

 

Counties of Tehran Province